"Everybody Loves a Nut" is a song written by Jack Clement and originally recorded by Johnny Cash on Columbia Records for his 1966 novelty album Everybody Loves a Nut.

Released in May 1966 as the second single (Columbia 4-43673, with "Austin Prison" on the opposite side) from the yet-to-be-released album, the song became a U.S. country top-20 hit.

Background and critical response 
In this song Cash "proclaim[s] that the world likes people a little off center and slightly weird."

Track listing

Charts

References

External links 
 "Everybody Loves a Nut" on the Johnny Cash official website

Johnny Cash songs
1966 singles
Columbia Records singles
1966 songs
Songs written by Jack Clement
American country music songs
Novelty songs
Song recordings produced by Don Law